Dreams Awake is a 2011 American drama film starring Erin Gray, Gary Graham, and Tim O'Connor. The film primarily takes place in Mount Shasta, California and was written, directed, and produced by Jerry Alden Deal. The film released to DVD on January 11, 2011, and premiered at the 2012 Houston WorldFest, where it won Gold Remis for Original Drama and Original Screenplay. It also showed at the 2012 Monaco Film Festival, where it won the Independent Spirit Award and Erin Gray won Best Female Actor.

Cast 
 Erin Gray as Hope Emrys
 Gary Graham as Marcus Emrys
 Tim O'Connor as Ambrose
 Najarra Townsend as Sofie Emrys
 Mitchell Presas as Troy Emrys
 Robert Pike Daniel as Shaemus
 Christian Carroll as Ryan

References

External links 

2011 films
American drama films
Films set in California
Films shot in California
2011 drama films
2010s English-language films
2010s American films